Idol 2019 was the fifteenth season of the Swedish Idol series.

New season 
It was confirmed on the 30 November 2018 semifinal of Idol 2018, that the series would return again on TV4.

Top 20 
Aida Secka, 24, Gothenburg
Annie Moreau, 21, Jönköping
Astrid Risberg, 20, Örebro
Christoffer Hamberg, 29, Tibro
Dao Di Ponziano, 17, Stockholm
Eden Alm, 19, Hässleholm
Filippa Johansson, 17, Alingsås 
Freddie Liljegren, 26, Örebro
Gottfrid Krantz, 24, Härnösand
Hampus Israelsson, 21, Falun
Hugo Burlin Nyström, 18, Vaxholm
Iana Kovalova, 26, Kyiv
Kim Lilja, 25, Luleå
Ludwig Hahn, 30, Västerås
Madelief Termaten, 17, Ängelholm
Malik Miller Sene, 23, Lund
Matilda Gramenius, 16, Lidingö
Nathalie Ulinder Cuti, 23, Gothenburg
Pawel Piotr Pospiech, 31, Malmö 
Tusse Chiza, 17, Leksand (Tällberg)

New to this season 
Something new to this season in the weekly finals was that the jury could use a lifeline that meant they could save an act who'd been eliminated from the competition a particular week, but they could only use this once and only during the first seven weeks. In the end, the jury did not enact the lifeline.

Elimination chart

Top 14

Top 12 - I'm an Idol

Top 11 - Breakthrough Hits

Top 10 - Worlds Best Songs

Top 9 - Melodifestivalen/Eurovision Song Contest

Top 8 - Thanks for all, England

Top 7 - Team spirit

Top 6 - Celebrity duets 

This week was the last chance for the jury to enact the lifeline.

Top 5 - National football teams' choices

Top 4 - Love

Top 3 - Jury's choices and previous song

Top 2 - Final

References

2019
2019 in Swedish music
2019 Swedish television seasons